The Hephaestus Fossae are a system of troughs and channels in the Amenthes quadrangle of Mars, with a location centered at 21.1 N and 237.5 W.  They are 604 km long and were named after a classical albedo feature name. The fossae have been tentatively identified as outflow channels, but their origin and evolution remain ambiguous. It has been proposed that water may have been released into the troughs as a catastrophic flood due to subsurface ice melting following a large bolide impact.

References

See also

 Fossa (geology)
 Geology of Mars 
 HiRISE

Amenthes quadrangle
Valleys and canyons on Mars